The Valorous Years is a serial novella by A. J. Cronin, initially published in 1940 in Good Housekeeping magazine. It is the moving story of a young man, Duncan Stirling, who, though his left arm is crippled by polio, is determined to become a physician. Woven into Stirling’s life are three women — Margaret, whose charm and beauty cast a spell over him; Anna, a brilliant surgeon who wants to heal his useless limb; and Jean, the compassionate daughter of a kindly country doctor, whom he later successes.  The story was also printed in book form by various international publishers.

1940 short stories
British short stories
British novellas
Short stories by A. J. Cronin
Works originally published in Good Housekeeping